Joseph Mirando (22 May 1931 – 22 August 2020) was a French professional racing cyclist. He rode in five editions of the Tour de France.

References

External links
 

1931 births
2020 deaths
French male cyclists
Sportspeople from the Province of Naples
Cyclists from Campania
Italian emigrants to France